= Thrikkadeeri-II =

- village
- Country: India
- State: Kerala
- District: Palakkad

Population (2011)
  - Total: 15,357

Languages
  - Official: Malayalam, English
- Time zone: UTC+5:30 (IST)
- PIN: 679503
- Vehicle registration: KL-

Thrikkadeeri -II is a village in Palakkad district in the state of Kerala, India.

== Demographics ==
As of 2011 India census, Thrikkadeeri -II had a population of 15357 with 7349 males and 8008 females.

== Schools ==
- Kuttikode English Medium Central School (KEMCS), Kuttikode
